Opinion polling was commissioned throughout the duration of the 44th New Zealand Parliament in the lead up to the 1996 election by various research organisations.

Individual polls
Polls are listed in the table below in chronological order. Refusals are generally excluded from the party vote percentages, while question wording and the treatment of "don't know" responses and those not intending to vote may vary between survey firms.

Unless otherwise noted the information is sourced from here:

See also
1996 New Zealand general election
Politics of New Zealand

Notes

References

1996
1996 New Zealand general election
New Zealand